The Bank of America Building, also called Oakland Bank Building and Oakland Bank of Savings, is a  high-rise located in downtown Oakland, California.  The building was originally constructed with nine floors, and the 18-story tower was  annexed  later. It was built as a headquarters for the Oakland Bank, which was acquired by Bank of America in 1929.

See also
List of tallest buildings in Oakland, California

References

External links

Commercial buildings completed in 1907
Bank of America buildings
Skyscraper office buildings in Oakland, California
1907 establishments in California